Julius Augustus "Doc" Wiseman (May 15, 1878 - April 3, 1953) was an American baseball player. He played for several minor league baseball clubs, mostly the Nashville Vols. He played in right field, where at Sulphur Dell there was a hill, known as "The Dump", earning him the nickname "the Goat". In 1901, the first season of the Southern Association, his batting average was .333. He hit the winning run to win the decisive game for the Southern pennant in 1908.

References 

1878 births
1953 deaths
Nashville Vols players
Baseball outfielders
People from Cincinnati
Cincinnati Bearcats baseball players